Michael Patrick Mohamed (born March 11, 1988) is a former American football linebacker. He was drafted by the Denver Broncos in the sixth round of the 2011 NFL Draft. He played college football at California. Mohamed is the first player of Punjabi and Indian descent in NFL history.

He has also played for the Jacksonville Jaguars, Tennessee Titans, Houston Texans, and New Orleans Saints.

Professional career

Pre-draft

Denver Broncos

Mohamed was drafted with the 24th pick of the 6th round, 189th overall, by the Denver Broncos in the 2011 NFL draft. He was released by the Denver Broncos on September 22, 2011, but was signed to the practice squad the next day. He was signed back to the active roster on November 29.

He was signed back on to the practice squad on October 2, 2012 and released again.

Jacksonville Jaguars
Mohamed was signed to the Jacksonville Jaguars' practice squad on September 13, 2012. On September 26, 2012, he was released from the practice squad.

Houston Texans
Mohamed signed a future contract with the Houston Texans on January 25, 2013.

During week 11 of the 2014 season, Mohamed intercepted a tipped pass thrown by Brian Hoyer of the Cleveland Browns.

New Orleans Saints
Mohamed signed a contract with the New Orleans Saints on November 4, 2015. He was waived by the Saints on November 10, 2015.

Personal life
He is of Punjabi Mexican American heritage, as his great grandfather was an immigrant from Punjab who settled in California in the 1900s.

References

External links

Denver Broncos bio
California Golden Bears bio

1988 births
Living people
American people of Mexican descent
American people of Punjabi descent
Players of American football from California
Sportspeople from Southern California
American football linebackers
California Golden Bears football players
Denver Broncos players
Jacksonville Jaguars players
Tennessee Titans players
Houston Texans players
New Orleans Saints players
People from Brawley, California